The 2016 Tallahassee Tennis Challenger was a professional tennis tournament played on green clay courts. It was the 17th edition of the tournament which was part of the 2016 ATP Challenger Tour. It took place in Tallahassee, Florida, United States between 25 April and 1 May 2016.

Singles main-draw entrants

Seeds

 1 Rankings as of April 18, 2016

Other entrants
The following players received wildcards into the singles main draw:
  Benjamin Lock
  Brian Baker
  Eric Quigley
  Tennys Sandgren

The following players received entry into the singles main draw as special exempts:
  Ernesto Escobedo
  Nicolás Jarry

The following players received entry from the qualifying draw:
  Sekou Bangoura
  Emilio Gómez
  James McGee
  Stefan Kozlov

Champions

Singles

 Quentin Halys def.  Frances Tiafoe, 6–7(6–8), 6–4, 6–2

Doubles

 Dennis Novikov /  Julio Peralta def.  Peter Luczak /  Marc Polmans, 3–6, 6–4, [12–10]

References
 Combo Main Draw

External links
Official Website

Tallahassee Tennis Challenger
Tallahassee Tennis Challenger
Tallahassee
Tallahassee Tennis Challenger